William Harmon Hollinger (April 27, 1921 – April 9, 2011) was an American football, basketball, and track and field coach and college athletics administrator. He served as the head basketball coach at Ripon College in Ripon, Wisconsin from 1950 to 1956. He returned to his alma mater, Hiram College in Hiram, Ohio, in 1956 and served as the head football coach (1956–1958) and head basketball coach (1956–1988). Hollinger was inducted into the National Association of Collegiate Directors of Athletics Hall of Fame for his tenure as the athletic director at Hiram.

Head coaching record

Football

References

1921 births
2011 deaths
Hiram Terriers athletic directors
Hiram Terriers football coaches
Hiram Terriers men's basketball coaches
Ripon Red Hawks men's basketball coaches
College track and field coaches in the United States
Hiram College alumni
People from Lisbon, Ohio
Sportspeople from Ohio